Infanta Josefina Fernanda of Spain (25 May 1827 – 10 June 1910) was an infanta of Spain, whom married morganatically to José Güell y Renté. She was a daughter of Infante Francisco de Paula and his first wife, Princess Luisa Carlotta of the Two Sicilies.

Josefina’s marriage to José Güell y Renté in 1848 caused Queen Isabella II of Spain to exile her. She returned to Spain in 1852 and was rehabilitated in 1855. Her spouse made a political career and she herself was known as a supporter of the progressive forces during the Spanish Revolution of 1854.

Biography 
Josefina Fernanda was born an infanta of Spain as the daughter of Infante Francisco de Paula of Spain and Princess Luisa Carlotta of the Two Sicilies.

On 4 June 1848, Josefina married morganatically to poet José Güell y Renté. When word spread of her marriage to José, Queen Isabella II of Spain exiled her from the royal court. While away from the royal court, Josefina had 3 children.

Josefina died on 10 June 1910, in Paris, France—aged 83.

Ancestry

References 

1827 births
1910 deaths
Spanish princesses